Marian Kociniak (11 January 1936 – 17 March 2016) was a Polish film and theatre actor, most notable for appearing in the 1970 film How I Unleashed World War II.

Biography
Born in Warsaw, Kociniak graduated from The Aleksander Zelwerowicz National Academy of Dramatic Art in Warsaw in 1959 from the teachings of Ludwik Sempoliński. From 1959 to his death, almost without interruption, he acted at the Ateneum Theatre. He appeared on televised Theatre, reenacting many novels from the time. He also appeared in Kabaret Starszych Panów. His screen debut came in the 1959 film Mr. Professor. He appeared in over 30 films since then. He also collaborated with radio appearing in the magazine 60 minut na godzinę, where he paired with Andrzej Zaorski on Polskie Radio Program III.

The popularity of the actor influenced creations of Franek Dolas in the famous Polish comedy How I Unleashed World War II and as a burgrave in the show Janosik, directed by Jerzy Passendorfer.

In 2003, during the VIII Festival of Stars in Międzyzdroje, he performed on the Promenade of Stars.

Since the beginning of his career, he did not agree to interviews. The exception is the interview for the BBC to mark the 50th anniversary of his artistic work.

From 2010 to 2016, he had been working with the Wola theatre.

He was an honorary member of the support committee for Bronisław Komorowski ahead accelerated presidential elections in 2010 and before the presidential elections in Poland in 2015. He died in 2016 at Warsaw.

Private life 
For over 50 years he was married to Grażyna Kociniak (died February 11, 2016), a film editor, member of the Polish Filmmakers Association. They had one daughter. Marian Kociniak was the cousin of Jan Kociniak, a theater and film actor who died in 2007.

Awards 

 Order of Polonia Restituta (2001)
 Cross of Merit
 Medal for Merit to Culture (2010).

References

External links

1936 births
2016 deaths
Polish Lutherans
Polish film actors
Polish male stage actors
Polish male voice actors
Polish cabaret performers
Polish male film actors
Male actors from Warsaw
People from Warsaw Voivodeship (1919–1939)
20th-century Lutherans
20th-century Polish male actors
21st-century Polish male actors
Recipients of the Gold Medal for Merit to Culture – Gloria Artis
Aleksander Zelwerowicz National Academy of Dramatic Art in Warsaw alumni